KSVN may refer to:

 KSVN (AM), a radio station (730 AM) licensed to Ogden, Utah, United States
 KSVN-CD, a television station (channel 49) licensed to Ogden, Utah, United States
 the ICAO code for Hunter Army Airfield
 Kurdish Students Association The Netherlands (KSVN)